Henry Martindale may refer to:

 Henry C. Martindale (1780–1860), American lawyer and politician from New York
 Henry Martindale (priest) (1879–1946), Archdeacon of Bombay